Svět kde se žebrá is a 1938 Czechoslovak comedy film, directed by Miroslav Cikán. It stars Hugo Haas, Marie Glázrová, and Ladislav Boháč.

References

External links
Svět kde se žebrá at the Internet Movie Database

1938 films
Czechoslovak comedy films
1938 comedy films
Films directed by Miroslav Cikán
Czechoslovak black-and-white films
1930s Czech films